Volya is a rural locality (a settlement) in Shukayevskoye Rural Settlement, Verkhnekhavsky District, Voronezh Oblast, Russia. The population was 58 as of 2010.

Geography 
Volya is located 28 km east of Verkhnyaya Khava (the district's administrative centre) by road. Aleksandrovka is the nearest rural locality.

References 

Rural localities in Verkhnekhavsky District